The 23rd Vancouver Film Critics Circle Awards were presented on February 13, 2023, to honour the films selected by the Vancouver Film Critics Circle as the best of 2022.

The nominations were announced on January 22, 2023, with The Banshees of Inisherin and Everything Everywhere All at Once leading the International film nominations with seven each. Riceboy Sleeps received the most Canadian film nominations with nine, followed by Until Branches Bend with six and Brother with five.

Winners and nominees

International

Canadian

References

External links
 

2022 film awards
2022 in Canadian cinema
2022 in British Columbia
2022